Sukhdev Thapar (15 May 1907 – 23 March 1931) was an Indian revolutionary who worked to make India independent from the British Raj along with his best friends and partners Bhagat Singh and Shivaram Rajguru. A senior member of the Hindustan Socialist Republican Association, he participated in several actions alongside Singh and Rajguru, and was hanged by the British government on 23 March 1931 at the age of 23.

Early life 
Sukhdev Thapar was born in Ludhiana, Punjab, British Raj on 15 May 1907 to Ramlal Thapar and Ralli Devi.

He belonged to a Punjabi Khatri family of Hindu community and he was brought up by his uncle Lala Achintram after the death of his father.

Revolutionary activities

Hindustan Socialist republican association 
Sukhdev Thapar was a member of the Hindustan Socialist Republican Association (HSRA) and Naujawan Bharat Sabha (NJSB), and organised revolutionary cells in Punjab and other areas of North India. He was the chief of Punjab unit of HSRA and instrumental in taking decisions.

Sukhdev participated in numerous revolutionary activities such as a prison hunger strike in 1929; he is best known for his assaults in the Lahore Conspiracy Case (1929–30). He is best remembered for his involvement in the assassination of Assistant Superintendent of Police, J. P. Saunders, on 17 December 1928, by Bhagat Singh and Shivaram Rajguru, undertaken in response to the violent death of the veteran leader Lala Lajpat Rai.

Lahore Conspiracy Case 
Sukhdev was the prime accused in the Lahore Conspiracy Case of 1929, whose official title was "Crown versus Sukhdev and others." The first information report (FIR) of the case, filed by Hamilton Harding, Senior Superintendent of police, in the court of R.S. Pandit, the Special Magistrate in April 1929, mentions Sukhdev as accused number 1. It describes him as Swami alias villager, son of Ram Lal, caste Thapar Khatri. After the Central Assembly Hall bombings in New Delhi (8 April 1929), Sukhdev and his accomplices were arrested, convicted, and sentenced to death.

On 23 March 1931, Thapar was hanged in Lahore Central Jail, along with Bhagat Singh and Shivaram Rajguru. Their bodies were secretly cremated at the banks of the River Sutlej.

Reactions to the executions 
The executions were widely reported in the press, especially as they took place on the eve of the annual convention of the Indian National Congress in Karachi.  The new york reported:
 B. R. Ambedkar, writing in an editorial in his newspaper Janata, blamed the British government for its decision to go ahead with the executions, despite strong popular support for the revolutionaries. He felt that the decision to execute the trio was not taken in the true spirit of justice, but was driven by the Labour Party-led British government's fear of backlash from the Conservative Party and a need to appease public opinion in England. The Gandhi-Irwin pact, signed just weeks before the execution, was viewed by the Conservatives as having dented the prestige of the British Empire. In such a situation, if the British government or the Viceroy of India commuted the death sentence awarded to the trio convicted of assassinating a British policeman, it would have given the Conservatives more ammunition to criticize an already weak British government in the parliament.

Legacy 

National Martyrs Memorial is located at Hussainiwala, where Sukhdev, along with Bhagat Singh and Rajguru, were cremated. A Martyrs' Day (Shaheed Diwas) is observed on March 23 in their memory. Tributes and homage are paid at the memorial.

Shaheed Sukhdev College of Business Studies, a constituent college of the University of Delhi, is named in memory of Sukhdev. It was established in August 1987.

Amar Shaheed Sukhdev Thapar Inter-State Bus Terminal is the main bus stand of Ludhiana city, the birthplace of Sukhdev.

See also 
 Ashfaqulla Khan
 Kakori Train Robbery
 Naujawan Bharat Sabha
 Revolutionary movement for Indian independence

References

Further reading
 

Punjabi Hindus 
Punjabi people
1907 births
1931 deaths
Executed revolutionaries
Indian revolutionaries
People from Ludhiana
20th-century executions by British India
Executed Indian people
People executed by British India by hanging
People executed for murdering police officers
National College of Arts alumni